The Spell Songs ensemble is a group of folk musicians originally formed to complement the 2017 book The Lost Words by Robert Macfarlane and Jackie Morris.

History

The Lost Words: Spell Songs 
Their first album was commissioned by Folk by the Oak Festival in 2018, and was released in July 2019.

Spell Songs II: Let the Light In 
Following a gathering of the ensemble at Greta Hall in the spring of 2021, Spell Songs II: Let The Light In was released in December, and reached number 1 on the UK Indie Breakers Chart in the same month.

Concerts 
Jackie Morris paints along with the performances.

References

External links 
 Official website
 YouTube channel

British folk music groups